Crib-y-rhiw is a top of Y Llethr and a ridge in the Rhinogydd of Snowdonia, north Wales. The summit straddles a thin ridge connecting Y Llethr to Diffwys.

References

Dyffryn Ardudwy
Ganllwyd
Llanbedr
Llanelltyd
Mountains and hills of Snowdonia
Mountains and hills of Gwynedd
Ridges of Wales
Nuttalls